Little Toby Creek is a tributary of the Clarion River in northwest Pennsylvania in the United States.

Little Toby Creek joins the Clarion River near the community of Portland Mills in Elk County.

See also
 Ellmont, Pennsylvania — ghost town on the creek.
 List of tributaries of the Allegheny River
 List of rivers of Pennsylvania

References

Rivers of Pennsylvania
Tributaries of the Allegheny River
Rivers of Elk County, Pennsylvania
Rivers of Jefferson County, Pennsylvania